Little Rollright is a hamlet in the civil parish of Rollright, Oxfordshire, about  northwest of Chipping Norton. It is the village nearest to the megalithic Rollright Stones.  An early spelling may be seen, its Latin form, as "Parva Rolrandryght" in 1446.   Little Rollright is in the Kingham, Rollright and Enstone ward of West Oxfordshire District Council and the Chipping Norton division of Oxfordshire County Council.

Parish church
The earliest parts of the Church of England parish church of Saint Philip are 13th-century, and include the chancel arch and buttresses. The present south windows of the chancel were inserted in the 15th century. The nave was rebuilt in the 16th century. The tower was built or rebuilt in 1617. The south porch and doorway, and a five-light window on the south side of the nave may be of the same date.  Inside the church are two 17th-century monuments to members of the Dixon family. The church is a Grade II* listed building.  St Philip's is part of the parish of Little Compton, Chastleton, Cornwell, Little Rollright and Salford. The parish is part of the Chipping Norton benefice, along with the parishes of Chipping Norton with Over Norton, Churchill and Kingham.

References

Sources

External links

Villages in Oxfordshire